Renan Abner do Carmo de Oliveira, known as Renan Oliveira (born 8 May 1997) is a Brazilian footballer who plays as a forward for Bosnian Premier League club Sarajevo.

Club career
Oliveira made his Ukrainian Premier League debut for Lviv on 30 July 2019 in a game against Desna Chernihiv. On 12 January 2023, he signed a two-year contract with Bosnian Premier League club Sarajevo.

Honours
Žalgiris
A Lyga: 2022
Lithuanian Football Cup: 2022

Individual
A Lyga top goalscorer: 2022

References

External links
 
 Renan Oliveira at ZeroZero

1997 births
Footballers from São Paulo
Living people
Brazilian footballers
Brazilian expatriate footballers
Association football forwards
FC ViOn Zlaté Moravce players
São Bernardo Futebol Clube players
Mosta F.C. players
San Gwann F.C. players
FC Lviv players
Gil Vicente F.C. players
FC Kolos Kovalivka players
FK Žalgiris players
FK Sarajevo players
Slovak Super Liga players
Maltese Premier League players
Ukrainian Premier League players
Primeira Liga players
A Lyga players
Premier League of Bosnia and Herzegovina players
Expatriate footballers in Slovakia
Brazilian expatriate sportspeople in Slovakia
Expatriate footballers in Malta
Brazilian expatriate sportspeople in Malta
Expatriate footballers in Ukraine
Brazilian expatriate sportspeople in Ukraine
Expatriate footballers in Portugal
Brazilian expatriate sportspeople in Portugal
Expatriate footballers in Lithuania
Brazilian expatriate sportspeople in Lithuania
Expatriate footballers in Bosnia and Herzegovina
Brazilian expatriate sportspeople in Bosnia and Herzegovina